This is a list of episodes for the anime television series UFO Baby. The series was adapted from a manga series of the same title by Mika Kawamura that was serialized by Kodansha in Nakayoshi between February 1998 and March 2002, and collected in nine bound volumes.

The television series was produced by NHK, animated by J.C.Staff, and directed by Hiroaki Sakurai. It was broadcast in 78 episodes between March 28, 2000 and February 26, 2002 on NHK's BS2 broadcast satellite network. It was later rebroadcast by Animax, who translated and dubbed the series into English and numerous other languages for broadcast across its respective networks worldwide, including Hong Kong, Taiwan, Southeast Asia, South Asia. The anime concluded before the manga did, resulting in different endings for each series.

Season 1

Season 2

References

External links
 NHK official site 
 J.C. Staff official website 
 Animax East Asia official website
 Animax South Asia official website
 

UFO Baby